Kantchari Airport  is a public use airport located near Kantchari, Tapoa, Burkina Faso.

See also
 List of airports in Burkina Faso

References

External links
 Airport record for Kantchari Airport at Landings.com

Airports in Burkina Faso
Tapoa Province